Cibola High School may refer to:

 Cibola High School (Arizona), Yuma
 Cibola High School (New Mexico), Albuquerque